The castra of Brusturi was a fort in the Roman province of Dacia in the 2nd and 3rd centuries AD. Its ruins are located in Brusturi (commune Creaca, Romania).

See also
List of castra

Notes

External links
Roman castra from Romania - Google Maps / Earth

Roman legionary fortresses in Romania
History of Crișana
Historic monuments in Sălaj County